Chonburi Hospital is the main hospital of Chonburi Province, Thailand and is classified under the Ministry of Public Health as a regional hospital. It has a CPIRD Medical Education Center which trains doctors for the Faculty of Medicine of Chulalongkorn University. It is an affiliated teaching hospital of Phramongkutklao College of Medicine.

History 
Chonburi Hospital was first constructed in 1919 as decided upon by the provincial governor and the local health authorities. The hospital initially had only one wooden building located 800 metres away from the coast and was named "Chonburi Provincial Hospital", managed by the local sukhaphiban. By 1935, as the management changed to the local thesaban system, the hospital had 2 patients buildings, 3 special care rooms and 1 operating theatre.

In 1940, plans were initiated to move the hospital to its present-day location next to Sukhumvit Road due to regular flooding which damaged the buildings. Construction was completed in 1948 and the hospital was officially opened on 18 November, with management transferred to the MOPH.

See also 

Healthcare in Thailand
 Hospitals in Thailand
 List of hospitals in Thailand

References 

Hospitals in Thailand
Chonburi province